David Holmes Huntoon, Jr. is an American former military officer who served as Superintendent of the United States Military Academy at West Point, New York.

Early life

Huntoon is a 1973 graduate of the United States Military Academy at West Point.

Military career

Huntoon served as an Infantry Officer in a series of command and staff assignments in the United States and Germany.  Following attendance at the Command and General Staff College and the School for Advanced Military Studies at Fort Leavenworth, Kansas, he was assigned to XVIII Airborne Corps, Fort Bragg, North Carolina.  There he deployed as a Senior War Plans Officer for Operation Just Cause, Operation Desert Shield and Operation Desert Storm. He commanded a mechanized infantry battalion at Camp Casey, Korea, and served in Combined and Joint Plans for the Combined Forces Command and United Nations Command in Seoul. He was the Army's National Security Fellow at the Hoover Institution, Stanford University.  He then took command of the 3rd U.S. Infantry Regiment (The Old Guard). Following his service as the Executive Officer to the Chief of Staff of the U.S. Army, he was selected as an Army brigadier general.  His general officer assignments were as Assistant Division Commander of the 1st Cavalry Division, Fort Hood, Texas; leadership of the U.S. Army Command and General Staff College; Director of Strategy, Plans and Policy for the US Army; Commandant of the U.S. Army War College; and Director of the Army Staff in the Pentagon.

In 2012 the Pentagon's Office of Inspector General found that Huntoon had misused his office while at West Point by asking subordinates to perform personal tasks for him. According to The Washington Post, the Inspector General and the Army kept the information confidential until required to release it after a Freedom of Information Act request shortly before he retired in 2013.
NOTE:  LTG Huntoon remained the Convening Authority for West Point while he was under investigation, when he was convicted and when he was censured.

Dates of rank

Awards and decorations

See also

List of United States Military Academy alumni (Superintendents)

References

Living people
Superintendents of the United States Military Academy
United States Military Academy alumni
United States Army generals
Recipients of the Legion of Merit
Recipients of the Distinguished Service Medal (US Army)
1951 births
People from West Point, New York